John Orloff is an American screenwriter.

Early life
Orloff was born in Los Angeles, California, where he was raised in a "Hollywood" family.  His father, also named John Orloff, was a TV commercial director.  His grandmother was B-movie actress Peggy Knudsen, and his great-grandparents were the real-life married couple of Fibber McGee and Molly, stars of TV and radio.

Orloff studied screenwriting at the University of California, Los Angeles Film School, and on graduation went to work in the advertising business.

Career
After ten years working on TV commercials in various positions, he met a TV movie development executive, now his wife, from the HBO television network. When she continually brought home what he felt were "awful" screenplays, he decided to write his own, a 16th-century English melodrama based on the Shakespeare authorship question, which ended up being sent to Tom Hanks and Steven Spielberg.

They were not interested in producing his project, but Hanks asked Orloff, a keen "World War II buff", to write for the 2001 HBO miniseries Band of Brothers.  Orloff wrote episode 2, "Day of Days" and episode 9, "Why We Fight".  His work earned him a Christopher Award, and an Emmy nomination for Outstanding Writing for a Miniseries, Movie or a Dramatic Special. It is the single highest grossing and best-selling TV DVD of all time, and one of the highest grossing DVDs of any kind.

In 2003, Warner Bros. paid over US$500,000 for the filming rights for Mariane Pearl's memoir A Mighty Heart, and Orloff was assigned to adapt the screenplay by producer Brad Pitt.  New York Times film reviewer Manohla Dargis declared the finished film "a surprising, insistently political work of commercial art".  Orloff's script for the film earned him an Independent Spirit Award nomination for Best First Screenplay.  In a 2011 interview with 60 Minutes Bob Simon, the film's star, Angelina Jolie, mentioned that  A Mighty Heart is her favorite film starring herself. 

Changing genres, Orloff next adapted the children's fantasy book series Legend of the Guardians, based on the Guardians of Ga'Hoole series of books written by Kathryn Lasky.  The animated 3-D film was directed by Zack Snyder, and was released in 2010.

Orloff created, wrote, and co-executive produced Apple+'s "Masters of the Air," a follow up to Band of Brothers, also produced by Tom Hanks and Steven Spielberg.

Filmography

Films

Television

References

External links
 

Living people
University of California, Los Angeles alumni
Year of birth missing (living people)
American male screenwriters
American television writers
American writers
American screenwriters
American male television writers